Professor Kranz tedesco di Germania is a 1978 Italian comedy film directed by Luciano Salce and starring Paolo Villaggio.
   
Despite the title the character played by Villaggio bears little resemblance from the one he played on Italian television shows under the same moniker. Instead of a sadistic/overbearing personality Kranz is here shown with a bumbling and meek demeanor more similar to that of the other 'loser' characters in Villaggio's repertoire (Fantozzi and Fracchia).

Plot
The story recounts the travesties of a German scientist/stage magician eking out a miserly life in Rio de Janeiro's favelas until getting involved in an improbable kidnapping/ransom plot.

Cast
 Paolo Villaggio as Kranz
 José Wilker as Leleco
 Vittoria Chamas as Dosdores
 Maria Rosa as Raimunda
 Walter D'Ávila
 Geneson Alexandre De Souza
 Joachim Soares
 Berta Loran
 Gina Teixeira
 Fernando José
 Adolfo Celi as Carcamano

References

External links

1978 films
1978 comedy films
Italian comedy films
1970s Italian-language films
Films directed by Luciano Salce
1970s Italian films